Lucas Herbert (born 13 September 1977) is a former Australian rules footballer who played with Adelaide in the Australian Football League (AFL).

Herbert was a primarily a ruckman, but could also play as a key forward. Originally from Mount Gambier, he started his SANFL career at Glenelg but was with North Adelaide when he was picked up in the 1998 AFL draft. Although Adelaide were premiers of the previous two years, Herbert was picked for the opening round of the season against the Western Bulldogs and had 10 disposals, 14 hit outs and a goal. He made a further 13 appearances in 1999 and finished the year with the second most hit outs at Adelaide, behind David Pittman, but would be delisted.

He continued playing for North Adelaide and then returned to Glenelg in 2004.

References

External links
 
 

1977 births
Australian rules footballers from South Australia
Adelaide Football Club players
Glenelg Football Club players
North Adelaide Football Club players
Living people